Roysambu is a commercial and residential suburb of the city of Nairobi. The neighbourhood was originally known as Royal Suburbs during the colonial era; morphed to Roy-Subs; then mispronounced as Roysambu by African locals. The neighbourhood is a high-density, hosting the lower middle income to low income segment of the Nairobi residents.

Location
It is located west of Kasarani; northeast of Zimmerman; south of Thome, north and west of Mirema.

Overview
The neighbourhood was originally known as Royal Suburbs during colonial times, shortened as Roy-Subs and later mispronounced by natives as Roysambu. The expansive land that Roysambu partly sits on was a coffee plantation before it was sold and subdivided.

Roysambu was initially zoned as a low-density residential neighbourhood, with
single family homes. However, the neighbourhood has increasingly gained a large population, residents from other parts of Kenya. It is a high-density residential area, with low-rise and occasional high-rise flats, due to its affordability for students and lower middle income to low income families.

Roysambu Constituency and Roysambu ward, both electoral divisions, borrow their names from the estate. The constituency encompasses other estates and neighbourhoods such as: Garden Estate, Thome, Ridgeways, Marurui, Kiwanja, Njathaini, Ngomongo, Kongo Soweto, parts of Kahawa and Githurai, Mirema, Kamiti, and Zimmerman. Both electoral divisions are within the Kasarani Sub-county

Points of interest
 The United States International University Africa (USIU), a higher learning private institution near Roysambu. 
 Thika Road Mall (TRM), a shopping mall in Roysambu, along TRM Drive off Thika Road.
 The Moi International Sports Centre, in Kasarani.

References

 

Suburbs of Nairobi